Simon Weatherstone (born 26 January 1980 in Reading, Berkshire, England) is a former English footballer. Following Weatherstone's 15-year playing career, he studied for his coaching badges, attaining the Pro License in 2020. During his coaching career, he coached at Burnley, serving as Head Coach of the U23 side.

At the end of the 2013/14 season, Simon was offered the position of First Team Coach at AFC Bournemouth. The following season, AFC Bournemouth went on to win the EFL Championship, and he spent five years in the Premier League in the First Team Coach role. During the summer of 2021, Simon left his post at AFC Bournemouth.

On 8 November 2021, Weatherstone joined Eddie Howe's backroom staff at Newcastle United, again as First Team Coach.

Weatherstone started his playing career at Oxford United, where he made his professional debut in Division 1, now known as the Championship, in 1997. Simon scored his first professional goal vs. Nottingham Forest at the City Ground in 1998. In February 2001, Simon was transferred to Boston United on 16 February 2001, along with his brother Ross Weatherstone, in the same deal.

The Weatherstones played a pivotal role in getting Boston United promoted to the Football League, winning the Conference National title in 2002. He scored at Hayes United on the last game of the 2001/02 season, helping the club to be promoted. Simon went on to play a significant role during Boston United's time within the EFL.

During this period, Simon earned the honour to represent his country, where he played for England national C team. He earned three caps and scored two goals.

On 23 January 2004, Yeovil Town bought Simon for £60,000. During the 2004/05 season, he made several appearances for Yeovil, where they were promoted to the third tier of the EFL. Later that season, Simon signed for Hornchurch, but ended the season at Stevenage Borough.

Simon played for Stevenage over the 2004/05 and 2005/06 seasons. Weatherstone played in the 2005 Conference National play-off final for Stevenage, which saw them lose the game 1-0 to Carlisle United.

In July 2006, Weatherstone signed for Weymouth. He played for the club during the 2006/07 and 2007/08 seasons. Weatherstone became club captain during this time. He scored one of his best goals when playing for Weymouth, against his future club Crawley Town , netting a half-volley from 40 yards out.

Crawley Town signed Weatherstone ahead of the 2008/09 season. He scored some important goals for the side during the season.

Weatherstone's last playing club was Eastbourne Borough in the Conference National. Simon scored his final career goal in the 84th minute, during the last day of the 2009/10 season. This goal kept Eastbourne in the Conference National, against the team where he started his career, Oxford United.

References

External links

1980 births
Living people
Sportspeople from Reading, Berkshire
English footballers
Association football midfielders
Oxford United F.C. players
Boston United F.C. players
Yeovil Town F.C. players
Hornchurch F.C. players
Stevenage F.C. players
Weymouth F.C. players
Crawley Town F.C. players
Eastbourne Borough F.C. players
English Football League players
National League (English football) players
AFC Bournemouth non-playing staff
Newcastle United F.C. non-playing staff
Footballers from Berkshire
Association football coaches